Anoye is a commune in the Pyrénées-Atlantiques department in the Nouvelle-Aquitaine region of southwestern France. It is part of the urban area (aire d'attraction des villes) of Pau.

The inhabitants of the commune are known as Anoyais or Anoyaises.

Geography

Anoye is located some 25 km north-east of Pau and 15 km west of Vic-en-Bigorre. It can be accessed by the D604 road coming north from the D7 just west of Baleix and continuing through the village and the commune north to Maspie-Lalonquere-Juillacq. The D224 road also goes east from the village to Momy and the D207 road forms part of the western border of the commune. The commune is heavily forested in the east and central west however there is a large area of farmland in a central north-south strip and also in the west.

The Léez river, a tributary of the Adour, flows from south to north in the east of the commune with a tributary forming the north-western border of the commune and another tributary forming part of the southern border. A further tributary flows east just south of the village into the Lees.

Historical Places and Hamlets

 Astis
 Bourdallé
 Cantou
 Capdepont
 Chambord
 la Commande or Lacommande
 Dibat
 Fustié
 Gassiabère
 Gué
 l'Honoré
 Hourticq
 Lasbarthes
 Latare
 Lermanou
 Mandou
 Mouly d'Anoye
 Mouly deu Poun
 Nouaou
 Perrieu
 Pessarthou
 Talabot
 Teulé
 Trianon
 Les Trois Fontaines
 Les Tuquets

Neighbouring communes and villages

Toponymy
The commune name in Bearnais is Anoja (according to the classical norm of Occitan).

Brigitte Jobbé-Duval states that the origin of the name is Latin (noda or noia) and refers to a "marshland".

The following table details the origins of the commune name and other names in the commune.

Sources:
Grosclaude: Toponymic Dictionary of communes, Béarn, 2006 
Raymond: Topographic Dictionary of the Department of Basses-Pyrenees, 1863, on the page numbers indicated in the table. 
Cassini: Cassini Map from 1750
Ldh/EHESS/Cassini: 

Origins:
Marca: Pierre de Marca, History of Béarn.
Saint-Pé: Cartulary of the Abbey of Saint-Pé
Fors de Béarn
Malta: Titles of the Order of St John of Jerusalem 
Census: Census of Béarn
Denombrement: Denombremont of Anoye
Pau:
Anoye: Titles of Anoye

History
Brigitte Jobbé-Duval indicates that the village, a stop on the Way of Saint James of Compostela, was identified in the 11th century. There was also a hospital at Anoye run by the Knights of St. John of Jerusalem under the responsibility of the Commander of Caubin.
 
In 1385, according to the census demanded by Gaston Phoebus, the village of Anoye had 45 fires and depended on the Bailiwick of Lembeye. There was a market, three to four bakeries, and seven shops.
 
In 1648 the Barony of Lons became a marquisate which included Abitain, Anoye, Baleix, Castillon, Juillacq, Le Leu (a hamlet in Oraàs), Lion, Lons, Maspie, Oraàs, Peyrède (fief of Oraàs), Sauvagnon, and Viellepinte. Paul Raymond noted that Anoye was a former archpriesthood of the diocese of Lescar, a member of the Commandery of Saint John of Jerusalem, of Caubin, and of Morlaàs.

Anoye was the chief town of a district called the Clau of Anoye comprising Anoye, Maspie, Juillacq, and Lion.

Administration

List of Successive Mayors

Inter-communality
Anoye is a member of four inter-communal structures:
The Communauté de communes du Nord-Est Béarn;
The SIVU of Highways of the Canton de Lembeye;
The AEP association of the Lembeye Region;
The Energy association of Pyrénées-Atlantiques.

Demography
In 2017 the commune had 144 inhabitants.

Culture and Heritage

Civil heritage
The commune has many buildings and structures that are registered as historical monuments:

A Fountain (1652)
A Hospital (ruins) of the Hospitallers of Saint John of Jerusalem and the Knights of St. John of Jerusalem of Sendets, founded in 1315. The hospital had two Maltese Boundary Markers (18th century) called maltaises which are registered as historical objects. One has been in the Museum of Morlaàs since 1965 and the second has disappeared.
A Mill at Mouly deu Poun (18th century)
A Mill at Mouly d'Anoye (1838)
A Bridge (1784) over the Léez.
A Fortified Complex (11th century) (Motte-and-bailey castle, outer courtyard, moat, entry portal, church, castle) was a lordship present in the 11th century.
A former Lay Abbey at Astis (1784)
The Castaing House (1831)
The Sanglar House (1788)
The Teinto House (1861)
The Puyo-Ladevèse Farmhouse at Mandou (1803)
The Poudjet Farmhouse (1844)
A Farmhouse at Pessarthou (1639)
A Farmhouse at Nouaou (1793)
A former Town Hall and School (1783)
The Loste Farmhouse (19th century)
A Farmhouse at l'Honoré (1793)
A Farmhouse at Lermanou (19th century)
A Farmhouse at Bourdallé (19th century)
A Farmhouse at la Commande (19th century)
A Farmhouse at Hourticq (19th century)
The Guithou House (16th century)
A Farmhouse at Fustié (19th century)
A Farmhouse at Cantou (1807)
Houses and Farms (17th-19th century)
The Chateau de Salettes (17th century)
The Maison Commune (Communal House) (1771)

Religious heritage
The commune has several religious buildings and sites that are registered as historical monuments:
A Presbytery (1701)
The Parish Church of Saint-Orens (remains) which was at a place called Astis until the 18th century.
The Parish Church of Notre Dame (12th century) was a former chapel from the 12th, 13th, and 14th centuries and was rebuilt in 1757, 1764, and 1878. The church contains many items which are registered as historical objects:
Furniture
7 Stained glass windows
3 Paintings
9 Statues
A Cemetery Cross
A Tombstone

Anoye is a stage on the via Tolosane (or Toulouse route) on the Way of St James.

See also
Communes of the Pyrénées-Atlantiques department

References

External links
Noye on the 1750 Cassini Map

Communes of Pyrénées-Atlantiques